The Central Athletic League, known colloquially as the Central League, is a high school sports league located in the suburbs of Philadelphia. Currently, the league consists of twelve high schools primarily from Delaware County with additional constituency from Chester and Montgomery counties.

Schools 
Conestoga High School (Tredyffrin/Easttown School District)
Garnet Valley High School (Garnet Valley School District)
Harriton High School (Lower Merion School District)
Haverford High School (School District of Haverford Township)
Lower Merion High School (Lower Merion School District)
Marple Newtown High School (Marple Newtown School District)
Penncrest High School (Rose Tree Media School District)
Radnor High School (Radnor Township School District)
Ridley High School (Ridley School District)
Springfield High School (Springfield School District)
Strath Haven High School (Wallingford-Swarthmore School District)
Upper Darby High School (Upper Darby School District)

Sports 
The schools all compete in varsity high school sports in the Pennsylvania Interscholastic Athletic Association, or the PIAA. Central League teams compete in District 1.

Fall 
 Boys Cross Country
 Girls Cross Country
 Field Hockey
 Football
 Golf
 Boys Soccer
 Girls Soccer
 Girls Tennis
 Girls Volleyball

Winter 
 Boys Basketball
 Girls Basketball
 Cheerleading
 Boys Swimming and Diving
 Girls Swimming and Diving
 Boys Indoor Track
 Girls Indoor Track
 Wrestling

Spring 
 Baseball
 Boys Lacrosse
 Girls Lacrosse
 Softball
 Boys Tennis
 Boys Track & Field
 Girls Track & Field

History 
The Central League started on May 28, 1966 as a spin-off from the Suburban League when nine schools, most of them along the Main Line, announced they were leaving the Suburban League to start the Central League, to begin play in the 1967 academic year. The schools that founded the league were Conestoga, Harriton, Haverford, Lower Merion, Marple, Penncrest, Radnor, Springfield and Upper Darby.

Ridley joined in 1969 when Harriton joined the Suburban 3 League. Harriton rejoined the league in 2008.

Strath Haven joined in 1983.

Garnet Valley joined in 2008.

At the end of the 1988 scholastic year, the Ches-Mont League was down to only four schools - Coatesville, Downingtown, West Chester East, and West Chester Henderson. Fearing that it could not operate as a four-team league, the remaining Ches-Mont schools applied for membership in the Central League, but they were rebuffed.  The PIAA tried to force the Central League to add the teams, but the Central League sued and won. Thanks to the ruling in this suit, the PIAA has no power to re-align sports leagues. Only the leagues themselves can do so. (High school federations in many other states can re-shape sports leagues at will.)

References

External links
 Central League online

High school sports conferences and leagues in the United States
High school sports in Pennsylvania
Pennsylvania high school sports conferences
Chester County, Pennsylvania
Sports leagues established in 1967
1967 establishments in Pennsylvania